Lagalla is the remnant of a lunar impact crater. Wilhelm partly overlies the northeastern rim, and Montanari is attached to the southeast. The remainder of the rim is heavily eroded, with small craters overlaying sections along most of the sides. The rim is nearly nonexistent to the south, and the most intact portion is along the northwest. Lagalla F, an irregular satellite crater, is attached to the western rim. The interior floor is uneven and relatively featureless.

Satellite craters
By convention these features are identified on lunar maps by placing the letter on the side of the crater midpoint that is closest to Lagalla.

References

 
 
 
 
 
 
 
 
 
 
 
 

Impact craters on the Moon